Clemens Gerard Antoon Cornielje (10 June 1958 – 17 March 2022) was a Dutch politician and political consultant and educator.

Biography
Born in Lobith, he was member of the People's Party for Freedom and Democracy (Volkspartij voor Vrijheid en Democratie). From 1994 to 2005 he was a member of the Dutch House of Representatives. From 31 August 2005 to 23 January 2019 he has been King's Commissioner (Queen's Commissioner until 2013) of the province of Gelderland.

Cornielje studied biology and mathematics at a vocational university in Nijmegen to become a teacher in secondary education. He was a member of the Roman Catholic Church, and was openly gay.

At the beginning of 2010, Cornielje was diagnosed with a malignant tumor, requiring him to resign. But he returned to work after several months. He was diagnosed with cancer again in May 2015. In April 2017, a brain tumor was discovered.

On 11 April 2018, Cornielje announced his intention to resign as King's Commissioner on 1 February 2019. He justified this not because of his illness, but because it is time for his successor. By announcing his departure early, according to him, there will be enough space to find his successor in time. He told his political party that he wanted to be a member of the Dutch Senate.

On 2 August 2018, it was announced that Cornielje had temporarily resigned from his duties as King's commissioner because of meningitis. He came back to his duties, and bid farewell to the position on 23 January 2019. He was officially replaced by John Berends on 6 February 2019.

Clemens Cornielje was one of three openly gay politicians who served as King's Commissioner, the other two are Jan Franssen and Arno Brok. He was in a relationship with his partner Bertil Niehoff. He died in Arnhem in March 2022.

See also
 List of openly LGBT heads of government
 List of LGBT holders of political offices in the Netherlands

References

External links 

  Queen's Commissioner Clemens Cornielje, Province of Gelderland website

 

1958 births
2022 deaths
Deaths from brain cancer in the Netherlands
Dutch educators
Dutch political consultants
Dutch Roman Catholics
King's and Queen's Commissioners of Gelderland
Gay politicians
Knights of the Order of Orange-Nassau
LGBT conservatism
LGBT King's and Queen's Commissioners of the Netherlands
LGBT members of the Parliament of the Netherlands
LGBT Roman Catholics
Members of the House of Representatives (Netherlands)
People from Rijnwaarden
People's Party for Freedom and Democracy politicians
20th-century Dutch LGBT people
21st-century Dutch LGBT people